Raoulostraca is a genus of sea snails, marine gastropod mollusks in the subfamily Turbonillinae of the family Pyramidellidae, the pyrams and their allies.

Species
Species within the genus Raoulostraca include:
 Raoulostraca diminuta Peñas & Rolán, 2016
 Raoulostraca directa Peñas & Rolán, 2016
 Raoulostraca inexpectata Oliver, 1915
 Raoulostraca laurea Peñas & Rolán, 2016
 Raoulostraca pseudocostata Peñas & Rolán, 2016
 Raoulostraca turrisecclesiae Peñas & Rolán, 2016

References

 Peñas A. & Rolán E. (2016). Deep water Pyramidelloidea from the central and South Pacific. 3. The tribes Eulimellini and Syrnolini. Universidade de Santiago de Compostela. 304 pp

External links
 Oliver, W. R. B. (1915). The Mollusca of the Kermadec Islands. Transactions of the New Zealand Institute. 47: 509-568
 To World Register of Marine Species

Pyramidellidae